Austrocossus minutus is a moth in the family Cossidae, and the only species in the genus Austrocossus. It is found in Argentina.

References

Cossulinae
Moths described in 1989